The blessed sword (or ) and the blessed hat (also: ducal hat,  or ,  or ) were a gift offered by popes to Catholic monarchs or other secular recipients in recognition of their defence of Christendom. Each pair was blessed by a pope on Christmas Eve in St. Peter's Basilica in Rome. The sword was an ornate ceremonial weapon, usually large, up to 2 metres long, with the hilt embellished with the pope's coat of arms, and the blade with the pope's name. A similarly ornate scabbard and belt were added to the sword. The hat was a cylinder made of red velvet with two lappets hanging down from its top. The right-hand side of the hat was decorated with a dove representing the Holy Spirit embroidered in pearls, while a shining sun symbolizing Christ was embroidered in goldwork on the top.

The earliest preserved blessed sword, now located at the Royal Armory in Madrid, was given by Pope Eugene IV to King John II of Castile in 1446. The latest preserved of the blessed swords, now at the National Museum of the Middle Ages in Paris, was blessed in 1772 by Pope Clement XIV and presented to Francisco Ximénez de Tejada, Grand Master of the Knights Hospitaller. Not all recipients are known; among those whose names have been preserved, there were at least twelve emperors of the Holy Roman Empire, ten kings of France, seven kings of Poland, and six kings of Spain. Additionally, three or four blessed swords and hats were given to kings of England, two or three to kings of Scots, and three each to the kings of Hungary and Portugal. Recipients also included various princes, including heirs-apparent, archdukes, dukes, noblemen, military commanders, as well as cities and states.

History 

The tradition of distributing blessed swords and hats by the popes is not as old as that of another papal gift, the golden rose, but it does date back at least as far back as the 14th century. The earliest recipient of a pontifical sword and hat who is known for certain was Fortiguerra Fortiguerri, a gonfaloniere of the Republic of Lucca, who received it from Pope Urban VI in 1386. However, papal account books record payments for the manufacture of such gifts as early as 1357, and even then it seems to have been a long-established practice. Some historians push the origin of the tradition even further back. According to Gaetano Moroni, Pope Innocent III presented a sword and hat to King William the Lion of the Scots in 1202. Lord Twining dismissed this proposition as legendary, but accepted that the tradition originated with Pope Paul I's gift of a sword to King Pepin the Short of the Franks in 758.

Starting with the pontificate of Pope Martin V (reigned 1417–1431), detailed payment records exist for the manufacture of swords and hats for every year, although the recipients are not always known. During the 15th century, popes gradually moved from the practice of presenting the swords and hats to noblemen or princes visiting Rome at Christmas time towards sending them to distant monarchs as either reward or encouragement to defend Christendom and the interests of the Catholic Church. The practice accelerated under Pope Nicholas V (r. 1447–1455), who used the gifts to promote a military alliance against the Ottoman Empire.

Description

Sword 

The hilt was made of silver and covered with elaborate repoussage in gold. The pommel was decorated with the pope's coat of arms surrounded with images of the papal tiara and pallium. The blade was embellished with intricate engravings. They included an inscription running along the length of the blade, indicating the pope's name and the year of his pontificate in which he blessed the sword. The accompanying scabbard and belt were similarly sumptuous and ornate, covered in velvet and studded with precious stones, and also bore the papal coat of arms. The identity of the recipient, on the other hand, was never indicated on the sword in any way. This practice stemmed from the Church's stance that the pope himself was the true defender of the faith, while the prince bestowed with the sword was merely the pontiff's armed arm. The symbolic significance of the sword was connected to the papal claim to both supreme spiritual and temporal power, derived from the Biblical story of Saint Peter using a sword to protect Jesus during his arrest in the Garden of Olives.

Hat 

The hat had the form of a stiff high cylinder surrounded by a deep brim, which curved upwards to a point at the front. In the back hanged two lappets, similar to those in a bishop's mitre. The hat was made of beaver pelt or velvet, typically dark crimson in colour, although grey and black are also mentioned in some accounts. It was sometimes lined with ermine. A haloed dove, symbolizing the Holy Spirit, was embroidered in goldwork and adorned with pearls on the right hand side of the cylinder. On top of the hat, a shining sun with alternatively straight and wavy rays that descended towards the brim, was likewise picked out in gold thread. The image of a dove symbolized the Holy Spirit protecting and guiding whoever was wearing the hat. The Holy Spirit together with Christ the Sun God may also be interpreted as symbolic references to God's incarnation, a mystery celebrated on Christmas, on the eve of which the hat and the sword were blessed by a pope.

Ten blessed swords from the 15th century have survived to present times, and about a dozen from the 16th century, although in some cases only the blade remains, while the more valuable hilt and scabbard have been lost. The hats, made of less durable materials, have been preserved in still smaller numbers, the earliest being from the second half of the 16th century. It is even impossible to ascertain whether the hat had always accompanied the sword from the beginning of the tradition or if it was a later addition.

Ceremony 

Popes used to bless the sword and the hat on every Christmas Eve. The blessing took place just before the matins in a simple ceremony conducted by the pope either in one of the private chapels of the papal palace or in the sacristy of St. Peter's Basilica. The pope, vested in an alb, amice, cincture and white stole, blessed both items held before him by a kneeling chamberlain by reciting a short prayer, the earliest form of which is attributed to Sixtus IV (r. 1471–1481). Then, the pope sprinkled the sword and hat with holy water and incensed them thrice before putting on a cappa (a long train of crimson silk) and proceeding to the basilica.

If the person whom the pope intended to award with the blessed sword and hat was present, he was invested with them immediately. Dressed in a surplice over his secular robes, the recipient was brought before the pope, who addressed him with Sixtus IV's brief Solent Romani pontifices, explaining the symbolism of the gift. It ended with the following words:

"[...] we appoint you, holy prince, as another sword of the Holy See, which has, we declare by this fine gift, a most devout son in you, and also by this hat we declare that you are a fortification and bulwark to protect the holy Roman Church against the enemies of the Faith. Therefore, may your hand remain firm against the enemies of the Holy See and of the name of Christ, and may your right hand be lifted up, intrepid warrior, as you remove them from the earth, and may your head be protected against them by the Holy Spirit, symbolized by the pearly dove, in those things deemed worthy by the Son of God, together with the Father and the Holy Spirit. Amen."

The sword was then girded over the recipient's surplice and he was dressed in a white cope. The morsel of the cope was fastened on his right shoulder so as to free his arm for drawing the sword later in the ceremony. The prince kissed the pope's hand and slipper as a sign of obeisance and, with his sword and hat, joined the procession to the basilica. During the matins, the recipient sang the fifth lesson, beginning with the words In quo conflictu pro nobis inito, taken from the homily of Saint Leo. An exception was made for emperors, who sang the seventh lesson, which begins with a quote from the Biblical account of the Census of Quirinius, Exiit edictum a Caesare Augusto ut describeretur universus orbis ("In those days a decree went out from Emperor Augustus that all the world should be registered"; Luke 2:1), deemed more appropriate because of the imperial connection. Before singing the lesson, the prince removed his hat and handed it to his servant, then unsheathed the sword, struck it against the ground three times, then brandished it in the air, again three times, and replaced it in the scabbard. As the matins ended, the recipient took leave of the pope and returned to his residence in Rome, preceded by a man-at-arms carrying the blessed sword and hat, and followed by cardinals, prelates, papal chamberlains, ambassadors to the Holy See, friends and retinue.

If the prospective honouree was absent at the ceremony, the sword and hat, after being blessed, were carried by the chamberlain before the cross in the procession and placed on the epistle side of the altar in the basilica. The gifts were then dispatched by the pope by a special emissary to present them to their intended recipient in a ceremony  (outside of the Holy See). The protocol was modelled on that prescribed for bestowing the golden rose outside Rome. The emissary, entrusted with the sword and hat, instructed about the proper protocol, equipped with the pope's letter to the honouree, as well as a safe conduct pass, set out with a small retinue, usually in the spring following the blessing ceremony. When the emissary was within a day's journey from his destination, the recipient was expected to send forth a delegation to escort the emissary to his lodgings. The papal brief was delivered to the prince who then had to choose the venue and date of the ceremony. Typically, the ceremony took place on a Sunday or a major feast day in a cathedral or the major church of the town. A solemn mass was celebrated either by the emissary or by a local bishop or abbot indicated by the pope. The pope's letter was solemnly read during the mass, following which the prince received the blessed sword and hat from the hands of the celebrant. When the ceremony was over, the recipient returned to his residence in a procession, as it would happen in Rome.

Recipients

See also 

 Golden Rose
 List of ecclesiastical decorations

References

Sources 

 

 

 

Holy See awards
European swords
Hats
Diplomatic gifts
Census of Quirinius
14th-century establishments in the Papal States
19th-century disestablishments in the Papal States